Tripartite motif containing 34 is a protein that, in humans, is encoded by the TRIM34 gene.

Function

The protein encoded by this gene is a member of the tripartite motif (TRIM) family. The TRIM motif includes three zinc-binding domains, a RING, B-box type 1 and B-box type 2 domain, and a coiled-coil region. Expression of this gene is up-regulated by interferon. This gene is mapped to chromosome 11p15, where it resides within a TRIM gene cluster. Alternative splicing results in multiple transcript variants. A read-through transcript from the upstream TRIM6 gene has also been observed, which results in a fusion product from these neighboring family members.

References

Further reading